The Donaldson Rowles House, located on North Ave. in Challis, Idaho, was built in 1910.  It was listed on the National Register of Historic Places in 1980.

The house is a log house built of sawn logs by Challis carpenter Donaldson Rowles (b.1885), who was son of Donaldson Rowles, a sheriff living in Challis in 1900.  Its original plan, a lateral rectangle with a forward-facing ell, is similar to that of the Bill Chivers House, another NRHP-listed house in Challis.  It had a dirt roof which was replaced in 1930 with sheet metal over round log purlins.  It was expanded by Rowles in 1926 to add a kitchen and other rooms in board and batten and horizontal log lean-tos on the east and north sides.

It is notable as an "owner-built example of late log architecture in Challis. The house represents the persistence of horizontal log construction into the twentieth century and the use of sawn logs, a rarity in Idaho log construction."

References

Houses on the National Register of Historic Places in Idaho
Houses completed in 1910
Custer County, Idaho
Log houses in the United States